Through the Glass Darkly is a 2020 American thriller film written and directed by Lauren Fash. The film premiered at the Frameline Film Festival on September 19, 2020.

Plot
Elrod, Georgia. A lesbian couple becomes the prime suspects after their own daughter, Lily, goes missing. A year has past since, and with no results in sight, Charlie and Angela decide to find her on their own. Meanwhile, another girl, Elodie Carmichael, goes missing in the same city as well. The police and neighbors assume that Charlie is the culprit behind the disappearances, however, she is determined to find the perpetrator who kidnapped her daughter even if it will cost her revealing her dark past.

Cast

Reception
Josiah Teal of Film Threat called it "a thriller for the #MeToo era".

Frank Scheck of The Hollywood Reporter wrote "Robyn Lively's affecting performance anchors this offbeat Southern Gothic thriller".

References

External links

2020 LGBT-related films
2020 thriller films
American LGBT-related films
American thriller films
Lesbian-related films
LGBT-related thriller films
Films set in Georgia (U.S. state)
2020s English-language films
2020s American films